Ophiodes striatus, the striped worm lizard, is a species of lizard of the Diploglossidae family. It is found in Brazil, Paraguay, and Uruguay.

References

Ophiodes
Reptiles described in 1824
Reptiles of Brazil
Reptiles of Paraguay
Reptiles of Uruguay
Reptiles of Bolivia
Taxa named by Johann Baptist von Spix